This page is intended to list all current compilers, compiler generators, interpreters, translators, tool foundations, assemblers, automatable command line interfaces (shells), etc.

Ada Compilers

ALGOL 60 compilers

ALGOL 68 compilers
cf. ALGOL 68s specification and implementation timeline

Assemblers (Intel *86)

Assemblers (Motorola 68*)

Assemblers (Zilog Z80)

Assemblers (other)

BASIC compilers

BASIC interpreters

C compilers

Notes:

Source-to-source compilers 
This list is incomplete. A more extensive list of source-to-source compilers can be found here.

C++ compilers

Notes:

C# compilers

COBOL compilers

Common Lisp compilers

D compilers

DIBOL/DBL compilers

ECMAScript interpreters

Eiffel compilers

Forth compilers and interpreters

Fortran compilers

Go compilers

Haskell compilers

Java compilers

Lisaac compiler

Pascal compilers

Perl Interpreters

PHP compilers

PL/I compilers

Python compilers and interpreters

Rust compilers



Smalltalk compilers

Tcl Interpreters

DCL Interpreters

Rexx Interpreters

CLI compilers

Open source compilers
Production quality, open source compilers.
 Amsterdam Compiler Kit (ACK) [C, Pascal, Modula-2, Occam, and BASIC] [Unix-like]
 Clang C/C++/Objective-C Compiler
 AMD Optimizing C/C++ Compiler
 FreeBASIC [Basic] [DOS/Linux/Windows]
 Free Pascal [Pascal] [DOS/Linux/Windows(32/64/CE)/MacOS/NDS/GBA/..(and many more)]
 GCC: C, C++ (G++), Java (GCJ), Ada (GNAT), Objective-C, Objective-C++, Fortran (GFortran), and Go (GCCGo); also available, but not in standard are: Modula-2, Modula-3, Pascal, PL/I, D, Mercury, VHDL; Linux, the BSDs, OS X, NeXTSTEP, Windows and BeOS, among others
 Local C compiler [C] [Linux, SPARC, MIPS]
 The LLVM Compiler Infrastructure which is also frequently used for research
 Portable C Compiler [C] [Unix-like]
 Open Watcom [C, C++, and Fortran] [Windows and OS/2, Linux/FreeBSD WIP]
 TenDRA [C/C++] [Unix-like]
 Tiny C Compiler [C] [Linux, Windows]
 Open64, supported by AMD on Linux.
 XPL PL/I dialect (several systems)
Swift [Apple OSes, Linux, Windows (as of version 5.3)]

Research compilers
Research compilers are mostly not robust or complete enough to handle real, large applications. They are used mostly for fast prototyping new language features and new optimizations in research areas.
 Open64: A popular research compiler. Open64 merges the open source changes from the PathScale compiler mentioned.
 ROSE: an open source compiler framework to generate source-to-source analyzers and translators for C/C++ and Fortran, developed at Lawrence Livermore National Laboratory
 MILEPOST GCC: interactive plugin-based open-source research compiler that combines the strength of GCC and the flexibility of the common Interactive Compilation Interface that transforms production compilers into interactive research toolsets. 
 Interactive Compilation Interface - a plugin system with high-level API to transform production-quality compilers such as GCC into powerful and stable research infrastructure while avoiding developing new research compilers from scratch
 Phoenix optimization and analysis framework by Microsoft
 Edison Design Group: provides production-quality front end compilers for C, C++, and Java (a number of the compilers listed on this page use front end source code from Edison Design Group).  Additionally, Edison Design Group makes their proprietary software available for research uses.

See also
 Compiler
 Comparison of integrated development environments
 List of command-line interpreters

Footnotes

References

External links
 List of C++ compilers, maintained by C++'s inventor, Bjarne Stroustrup
 List of free C/C++ compilers and interpreters
 List of compiler resources

Compilers